is an autobahn in southern Germany. It runs through the Allgäu and is part of the once-proposed A 98 plans that were never carried out.

Exit list 

|-
|colspan="3"|

|}

External links 

980
A980